Banyeres de Mariola is a settlement and a municipality in the north of the province of Alicante (Spain), 860 metres above sea level, with a population of 7,500. The main employer is the local textile industry.  The town has a Moorish castle that dates from 1214, and is surrounded by mountains, almond and olive trees.

From the 22 to the 25 April each year the town celebrates the Moros i Cristians (Moors and Christians) festival, commemorating the 13th century defeat by the Christians of the occupying Moorish rulers. It is a festival of pageantry, costume, and pyrotechnics.

Climate 
According to the Köppen climate classification, Banyeres has a Csa hot-summer mediterranean climate, highly influenced by the altitude and the distance from the sea, having also continental factors. The winters are cool, and the summers are hot during the day and mild during the night.

Main sights 
 Castle of Banyeres
 Route of the Castles of Vinalopó

See also 
 Serra Mariola Natural Park
 Route of the Castles of Vinalopó

References

Municipalities in the Province of Alicante
Alcoià